Solomon George Washington Dill (c. 1818  1868) was an abolitionist who was a member of the South Carolina House of Representatives and a delegate of the state's 1868 Constitutional Convention. He was murdered because of his support for civil rights for African Americans. 

Under the Reconstruction Acts enacted by congress, federal military troops remained and were in charge of much of the Southern United States until the state could prove that they had met all of the qualifications to be self-governing. Because of this, Army 1st Lieutenant George Price headed the investigation into Solomon Dill’s assassination. According to his investigation, Dill was native to South Carolina, had “a fair education” and “some property.” Dill helped draft the 1868 South Carolina Constitution and was elected to multiple government positions during his political career. Though he was white, his supporters included many recently freed African Americans because of his liberal views on equality. The Greenville Enterprise reported there was a large funeral procession exclusively of blacks and noted arrests were made but cast doubt on whether there was evidence against the "respectable white men" taken into custody.

Political career 
Dill was a controversial figure in Southern politics for his anti-slavery view. He advocated against propositions like literacy and property ownership as qualifications for voting, stating “I do not believe that anybody with a Christian heart…would introduce such a bill…it is a fraud or a swindle.” After he publicly announced he was a Republican, he was consistently harassed, and even believed he would be murdered, but refused renounce the principles. Dill also had a friend stand guard outside of his house every night because of the constant death threats he would receive but given that the night of the murder was after the election, they thought that all of the threats would subside. Despite the criticism, he also had a large support base, mainly of freedmen, that were able to get him elected on April 14 to the State Legislature position. He also ran for State Commissioner on June 2–3 and won that position posthumously.

Dill often gave speeches to freed people, and anyone else who wanted to join, giving advice and about the importance of patience and moderation. Opponents to Dill spread propaganda that he discussed hatred and advocated violence, but LT Price could find no actual evidence to those claims being true. And from his investigation they appeared to just be propaganda from his opponents. After his murder, many of the local white population expected the African Americans to riot because of the murder, but a few African Americans that were interviewed stated the reason why they did not was because Dill would not have wanted that because he often preached about remaining peaceful and they “felt strongly that the guilty should suffer, but not the innocent.”

Constitutional Convention 
Dill represented the state of South Carolina and helped draft their State Constitution of 1868. The state created a Constitution of 1865 but needed to be rewritten to accommodate for the 14th Amendment. After the federal passing of the 14th Amendment, South Carolina was mandated to ratify it and create a new constitution that allowed African Americans to vote. South Carolinians that were able to vote, which included African Americans for the first time, selected delegates from their voting districts. Solomon Dill was one of the delegates selected to help with the task because of his adamant anti-slavery views. The South Carolina Constitutional Convention of 1868 was the first convention to have African Americans participate in the drafting of the state constitution. Dill and 123 other delegates met in Charleston, South Carolina beginning on January 14, 1868 and lasted until March 17th, totaling 53 working days. Dill was part of the “Radical Republicans” within the convention which equaled 63 of the delegates, Dill was one of only 13 whites that was a part of this group. Out of the 124 delegates Dill was one of 48 white men and the other 76 attendees were African American men.

Murder 
The Ku Klux Klan was founded in Tennessee in 1866, but by 1868 had roots in South Carolina. South Carolina had an election in Fall of 1868 and the KKK sought to intimidate and eliminate some of those that did not agree in their message. South Carolina saw a rise in violence that was a direct result of the upcoming election, though not all of it was organized by the KKK. Dill was one of three Republican politicians that were murdered in South Carolina that year while they were running for office and at least 100 people that were either murdered, beaten or sexually assaulted between 1868 to 1871 because of their ethnicity or political views. While it isn’t known if Dill’s assassins were direct members of the KKK, the groups rapid growth and dissemination throughout the South represents an upward trend of violence toward African American and white sympathizers that was taking place throughout the South during this era.

On Thursday June 4, 1868 Dill was at his home in Kershaw County with his wife, Rebecca Dill, and a friend, Nestor Ellison, an African American freedman, among other guests. Just after sunset at eight o’clock, a group went to his home and ended up shooting Dill in the cervical portion of the spine, killing him, and shot Ellison in the head, killing him as well. His wife was injured as well but survived. She told investigators that they were sitting inside the house when an unknown gunman began to fire shots into their house. Dill was hit immediately alongside Ellison, while Rebecca was shot as she was trying to escape.

In all, nine guests gave sworn testimonies from that night, but no killer was positively identified from the testimonies. The coroner, J.K. Witherspoon, examined Dill’s body concluded he died of homicide and reported that he died from two gunshot wounds.

After the community made no effort to find Dill’s killers, LT. Price and a detachment of soldiers were sent to the town to investigate the murder further. A $10,000 reward was offered to anyone who gave information that led to the arrest of any assassins. LT. Price Ultimately concluded that 10 shots were fired into the East door of the Dill residence the night of the 4th. By July 10 11 white men were arrested for the murder of Solomon Dill: Joseph Huckabee, William Nelson, George Mattox, John Picket, John Mickle, Abram Rabon, M. P. Kelly. William Kelly, Emmanuel and William Parker, and Dr. John A Glenn. Samuel Mattox was a 12th suspect was believed to have been involved as well and was the father of George Mattox, but he Samuel was deemed too old to be placed in jail, so they allowed him to return home where he could be cared for.

July 10 was also the last official report written by LT. Price. After that, the murder suspects and all information pertaining to the investigation were handed over to the South Carolina Attorney General. Because of the constitutional convention that Solomon Dill was a part of, a new constitution was ratified, and accepted by Congress, thus fulfilling South Carolina’s requirements the federal government had imposed on the Southern states in order to gain back their autonomy, and the military was beginning to pull out of the state.

References

1810s births
Year of birth missing
1868 deaths
19th-century American politicians
People of the Reconstruction Era
Radical Republicans
South Carolina politicians
1868 murders in the United States
Assassinated American politicians
People murdered in South Carolina
Deaths by firearm in South Carolina
Assassinated American State House representatives